{|class="wikitable" style="float:right"
|+ Ionic radii (pm)
|-
|Al||Sc||Y||La||Lu
|-
|53.5||74.5||90.0||103.2||86.1
|}

Scandium compounds are compounds containing the element scandium. The chemistry of scandium is almost completely dominated by the trivalent ion, Sc3+, due to its electron configuration, [Ar] 3d14s2. The radii of M3+ ions in the table below indicate that the chemical properties of scandium ions have more in common with yttrium ions than with aluminium ions. In part because of this similarity, scandium is often classified as a lanthanide-like element.

+3 oxidation state

Oxides and hydroxides 

The oxide  and the hydroxide  are amphoteric:
 + 3  →  (scandate ion)
 + 3  + 3  → 

α- and γ-ScOOH are isostructural with their aluminium hydroxide oxide counterparts.

Halides and pseudohalides 

The halides , where X= Cl, Br, or I, are very soluble in water, but  is insoluble. In all four halides, the scandium is 6-coordinated. They can be prepared by reacting scandium oxide or scandium hydroxide
with the corresponding acid:

 Sc(OH)3 + 3 HX → ScX3 + 3 H2O

The halides are Lewis acids; for example,  dissolves in a solution containing excess fluoride ion to form . The coordination number 6 is typical for Sc(III). In the larger Y3+ and La3+ ions, coordination numbers of 8 and 9 are common. Scandium triflate is sometimes used as a Lewis acid catalyst in organic chemistry.

Other oxidation states 

Compounds that feature scandium in oxidation states other than +3 are rare but well characterized. The blue-black compound  is one of the simplest. This material adopts a sheet-like structure that exhibits extensive bonding between the scandium(II) centers. Scandium hydride is not well understood, although it appears not to be a saline hydride of Sc(II). As is observed for most elements, a diatomic scandium hydride has been observed spectroscopically at high temperatures in the gas phase. Scandium borides and carbides are non-stoichiometric, as is typical for neighboring elements.

Lower oxidation states (+2, +1, 0) have also been observed in organoscandium compounds.

Organic derivatives 

Scandium forms a series of organometallic compounds with cyclopentadienyl ligands (Cp), similar to the behavior of the lanthanides. One example is the chlorine-bridged dimer,  and related derivatives of pentamethylcyclopentadienyl ligands.

See also 

 Yttrium compounds
 Titanium compounds

References 

Scandium
Scandium compounds
Chemical compounds by element